Anası Kızından() is a Turkish and Anatolian Greek folkloric tune (Kaşık Havası) or Halay.

Original form
The original form of the türkü was popular in Central Anatolia(Konya Ilgın),(Çankırı) .

See also
Kasik Havasi
Efi Thodi

References

Turkish music
Turkish songs
Greek songs
Serbian music
Serbian songs